The Urban Knights are an all-star jazz fusion band. They released their self tilted debut in 1995. They have a total of 8 studio albums.

Overview
The Urban Knight's debut album, Urban Knights I, was released in 1995 by GRP Records. Produced by Maurice White, the album features musicians such as Grover Washington, Jr., Ramsey Lewis, Omar Hakim, Victor Bailey, Freddie Hubbard and The Emotions. The album reached the top five on the Billboard Jazz Albums chart.

The jazz group's follow up LP, Urban Knights II was released in 1997 by GRP. Once again produced by Maurice White, the album features saxophonists Gerald Albright and Najee as well  as guitarists Jonathan Butler, Verdine White and Morris Pleasure.

During 2000, the group's third studio album, Urban Knights III, was issued on Narada Records. Artists such as Dave Koz, Earl Klugh, and Fareed Haque played upon the LP. People proclaimed "sixties jazz-pop pioneer Ramsey Lewis (“The In Crowd”) contributes keyboards on 10 of these 12 tracks by the latest group of hot, young Chicago musicians he has assembled for this urbane joust." Hilarie Grey of Jazz Times said "Ramsey Lewis’ Urban Knights III exploits the urban sophistication and stylish blue roots of its Chicago setting".

Discography

Albums

References

Jazz fusion ensembles
Smooth jazz ensembles